The Oklahoma State Department of Health (OSDH) is a department of the government of Oklahoma under the supervision of the Oklahoma Secretary of Health. The department is responsible for protecting the health of all Oklahomans and providing other essential human services. The OSDH serves as the primary public health protection agency in the state.

The department is led the State Commissioner of Health, who is appointed by the governor of Oklahoma with the approval of the Oklahoma Senate to serve at the pleasure of the Governor. The Commissioner is the executive officer of the department and is the lead public health authority in the state. To assist the Commissioner is the State Board of Health, composed of nine members appointed by the governor of Oklahoma with the approval of the Oklahoma Senate, which serves as advisory board to the Commissioner.

Leadership
The department is led by the Secretary of Health and the Commissioner of Health. Oklahoma law requires the Commissioner of Health to have professional expertise as any of the following: 1) an actively licensed physician (MD/DO), 2) a doctoral-level degree holder in public health or public health administration, 3) a masters' degree holder with a minimum of five years experience in administering health services. 

, under Governor of Oklahoma Kevin Stitt, Kevin Corbett serves as Cabinet Secretary (and CEO of the Oklahoma Health Care Authority) and Keith Reid, RN serves as the Interim Commissioner of Health. Reid succeeded Colonel Lance Frye, MD who also served under Governor Kevin Stitt from May 2020 until his resignation on October 25, 2021. OSDH's central office in Oklahoma City provides administrative oversight for the state's system of county health departments, which are overseen by regional administrators reporting to the State Commissioner.

State Board of Health
The State Board of Health is the governing body of the Health Department. The Board is composed of nine members appointed by the Governor of Oklahoma with the approval of the Oklahoma Senate. Each Board member serves a nine-year term. Eight of the nine members represent specific county regions of the state and one member is appointed to represent the state at large.

, the Board is composed of the following members:

Organization
, the organization of the department is as follows:

Oklahoma Secretary of Health
Commissioner of Health
Community Health Services
Personal Health Services
Chronic Disease Services
Community Development Services
Immunization Services
Injury Prevention Services
Family Health Services
Dental Health Services
Family Support and Prevention Services
Maternal and Child Health Services
Screening and Special Services
SoonerStart Services
Women, Infants, and Children Services
County Health Departments
Nursing Services
Community Health Records
Quality Assurance and Regulatory Services
Long Term Care Services
Medical Facilities Services
Health Resource Development Services
Consumer Health Services
Health Preparedness Services
Public Health Laboratory
Emergency Preparedness and Response Services
Chief Science Officer
State Epidemiologist
Acute Disease Services
Sexual Health and Harm Reduction Services
Center for Health Statistics
Vital Records
Chief Administrative Officer
Support Services
General Counsel
Policy and Rulemaking
Human Resources
Enterprise Systems Services
Chief Financial Officer
Revenue and Accounts Payable
Procurement
Payroll and Travel
Financial Planning and Analysis
Grant Management
Grant Accounting
Operations Excellence
Chief Strategy and Business Performance Officer
Strategy and Transformation
Chief Technology Officer
Project Managment Office
Chief of Staff
Communications
Legislative Liaison
Chief Medical Officer
State Board of Health
Office of Accountability Systems
Internal Audit

Management and Finance

Staffing
The Health Department, with an annual budget of well over $300 million, is one of the largest employers of the State. For fiscal year 2014, the department was authorized 2,148 full-time employees.

Budget
The divisions of the department operation with the following operating budgets for Fiscal Year 2019:

Supporting Agencies
Alarm Industry Committee
State Barber Advisory Board
Breast Cancer Prevention and Treatment Advisory Committee
Office of Child Abuse Prevention
Interagency Child Abuse Prevention Task Force
Child Abuse Training & Coordination Council
Childhood Lead Poisoning Prevention Advisory Council
Licensed Professional Counselors Advisory Board
Dental Health Service
Driver's License Medical Advisory Committee
Emergency Response Systems Development Advisory Council
Health Care Information Advisory Committee
Hearing Aid Advisory Council
Home Health Advisory Board
Hospice Advisory Council
Long-Term Care Facility Advisory Board
Licensed Marital & Family Therapists Advisory Board
Medical Audit Committee
Organ Donor Education & Awareness Program Advisory Council
Interagency Council on Osteoporosis
Radiation Advisory Committee
Residents and Family State Council
Sanitarian & Environmental Specialist Registration Advisory Council
Vision Screening Standards Advisory Committee

References

External links

Health, Department of
State departments of health of the United States
Medical and health organizations based in Oklahoma